Jitka Landová (born 20 July 1990 in Jablonec nad Nisou) is a former Czech biathlete, AND a double Winter Universiade winner in the mass start competition. She competed at the Biathlon World Championships 2012 in Ruhpolding and at the Biathlon World Championships 2013 in Nové Město na Moravě. She competed at the 2014 Winter Olympics in Sochi. Her best result here was 3rd place in relay, shared with her Czech teammates Eva Puskarčíková, Gabriela Soukalová and Veronika Vítková. Apart from that, she also competed in sprint, pursuit and individual.

References 

1990 births
Living people
Sportspeople from Jablonec nad Nisou
Biathletes at the 2014 Winter Olympics
Czech female biathletes
Olympic biathletes of the Czech Republic
Universiade medalists in biathlon
Universiade gold medalists for the Czech Republic
Universiade bronze medalists for the Czech Republic
Competitors at the 2013 Winter Universiade
Competitors at the 2015 Winter Universiade